Aatma Bandhuvu is a 1962 Indian Telugu-language drama film, produced by Sarathi Studios and directed by P. S. Ramakrishna Rao. The film stars N. T. Rama Rao and Savitri, with music composed by K. V. Mahadevan. It is a remake of the Tamil-language film Padikkadha Medhai (1960), which itself was a remake of 1953 Bengali-language film Jog Biyog, based on Jog Biyog, a novel of Ashapurna Devi.

Plot 
Rao Bahadur Chandrasekharam is a successful businessman and has a loving family with compassionate wife, Parvathi, 3 sons; Prasad, Sridhar and Raghu, 2 daughters, the widowed Mangalamba and Geetha, 2 daughters-in-law Lalitha, Kamala, and their children. Along with them, they adopt an orphan Ranga, an innocent guy who is utterly devoted to the family. Meanwhile, Parvathi promises to make her childhood friend's (Prabhavathi) daughter Lakshmi as her third daughter-in-law, but Raghu refuses it because he is already in love with a girl Janaki. To Keep up Parvathi's word, Ranga marries Lakshmi. Everything moves happily, Geetha also gets a rich alliance with Madhu, son of Rajarao. But suddenly, life takes a U-turn, where Chandrasekharam is bankrupted, Geetha's marriage is called off. There onwards, his family members' attitudes completely change and they start seeing Rao Bahadur in a low profile. Ranga could not tolerate it and reacts to them, so, they put the blame of theft on him. Seeing this, Chandrasekharam asks Ranga and Lakshmi to leave the house. Ranga gets acquaintance with a person Kotaiah and finds a job in a factory owned by Rajarao. Afterward, broken-hearted Chandrasekharam dies leaving his wife and youngest daughter to be in their children's merciless care. Finally, Ranga, with his simplicity and pure-hardheartedness, proves in the end that love and affection is the greatest wealth.

Cast 

N. T. Rama Rao as Ranga
Savitri as Lakshmi
S. V. Ranga Rao as Rao Bahadoor Chandra Shekaram
Relangi as Kotaiah
Haranath as Madhu
Padmanabham as Raghu
Raja Babu as Mohan
Dr. Sivaramakrishnaiah as Retired Army officer Damodaram
A. V. Subba Rao as Raja Rao
Vallam Narasimha Rao as Prasad
Edida Nageswara Rao as Sridhar
Kannamba as Parvathi
Suryakantham as Mangalamba
Girija as Geeta
Surabhi Balasaraswathi as Anjamma
Sarada as Janaki
Meena Kumari as Lalitha
Mohana as Kamala

Soundtrack 
Music composed by K. V. Mahadevan.

References

External links 
 

1962 drama films
1962 films
Films about families
Films based on works by Ashapurna Devi
Films directed by P. S. Ramakrishna Rao
Films scored by K. V. Mahadevan
Indian drama films
Telugu remakes of Bengali films
Telugu remakes of Tamil films